The U.S. state of Indiana has 17 official state emblems, as well as other designated official and unofficial items. The majority of the symbols in the list are officially recognized and created by an act of the Indiana General Assembly and signed into law by the governor. They are listed in Indiana Code Title 1, Article 2, State Emblems which also regulates the appearance and applicable use of the items.

Compared to other states, Indiana has few official symbols. The first symbol was the Seal of Indiana, which was made official in 1801 for the Indiana Territory and again in 1816 by the state of Indiana. It served as the state's only emblem for nearly a century until the adoption of the state song in 1913.  For many years, Indiana was the only state without a flag. The official state banner was adopted in 1917, and renamed the state flag in 1955. The newest symbol of Indiana is state fossil, mastodon, which was declared in 2022.

Insignia

Species

Geology

Culture

Unofficial symbols and unsuccessful proposals
While most states have an official nickname, the Indiana General Assembly never officially adopted one. Indiana's unofficial nickname is "The Hoosier State". A word of unknown origin, Hoosier is the official demonym for the people of Indiana. The state has had several unofficial marketing slogans through the years, including "Restart Your Engines" (2006–2014), "Honest-to-Goodness Indiana" (2014–2022), and most recently, "IN Indiana".

Indiana's unofficial state soil, Miami, is a brown silt loam found widely across the state. The soil is productive for cultivation, contributing to the state's robust agricultural economy. The Indiana Senate approved a resolution naming water as the official state beverage in 2007. Sugar cream pie (or "Hoosier Pie") was designated the "unofficial state pie" in 2009.

Notes
At the time, the northern cardinal's scientific name was Richmondena Cardianalis Cardinalis. It was changed in 1983.
From 1923 to 1931, the state flower was the flower of the tulip tree. From 1931 to 1957, the state flower was the Zinnia.

See also

Lists of United States state insignia

References

External links

State symbols
Indiana